Raimundo Monteiro dos Santos (born May 22, 1957) is a Brazilian politician. He was born in Castelo do Piauí and was superintendent of INCRA (2003–2007). Monteiro is former president of PT in Maranhão. Monteiro ran the government of Maranhão for coalition Maranhão present, Lula president (PT, PCB), ranking third place.

References 

Living people
1957 births
Workers' Party (Brazil) politicians